The siege of Érsekújvár (siege of Uyvar) also known as the siege of Neuhäusel occurred in 1663 when Grand Vizier Fazil Ahmed Pasha leading the Ottomans invaded Habsburg Hungary and captured the Hungarian fortress at Érsekújvár (Hungarian: Érsekújvár, German: Neuhäus[e]l, Latin: Novum Castrum, modern Nové Zámky in southern Slovakia).

Background 
In the first half of the 17th century, a stalemate was reached between the Ottoman Empire and the Habsburg Austria. After many peaceful years, however, border clashes began. John Kemény the Habsburg candidate to the Transylvanian throne, was trying to defeat the Ottoman vassal Michael I Apafi. Although Apafi won the throne with Ottoman support, Austrians captured the forts of Kolozsvár (modern: Cluj-Napoca in Romania) and Székelyhíd (modern: Săcueni in Romania). They also built the fort of Zrínyiújvár (in Croatian Novi Zrin) facing the Ottoman fort of Kanije (now Nagykanizsa in Hungary). Meanwhile, the Ottoman army was marching to Dalmatia in the scope of Cretan War (1645-1669) against Venice. Ottoman Sultan Mehmet IV gave the priority to the Austrian front and the army changed its course.

Peace talks 
The commander of the Ottoman army was Grand Vizier Fazıl Ahmet Pasha (a member of Köprülü family). While he was marching to the Austrian front, the Austrians appealed for peace. There were a series of three peace negotiations; the first in Belgrad (now the capital of Serbia); the second in Eszék (modern Osijek in Croatia); and the third in Budapest (now the capital of Hungary). The Turks sought reparations of 200,000 florins and the withdrawal of the Austrian army. Ultimately the Habsburgs rejected the Turkish terms and the peace talks ended.

Siege 
Fazıl Ahmet Pasha decided to march to Érsekújvár a major fort in Northern Hungary (now in Slovakia). It was fortified and in the 16th century the Turks had tried several times to capture it in vain. The popular saying  "Strong (insistent) as a Turk in front of Nové Zámky",  reflects the memory of conquest determination of the Ottomans. Before the army reached to Érsekújvár on August 7 the commander of Érsekújvár Ádám Forgách tried to raid the Ottoman camp. But this attempt was disastrous for the Austrians. The siege began in August and the fort was captured on 13 September. According to the treaty of surrender, the residents of Érsekújvár were given free passage to Austria and a letter was written to the Austrian government to certify that the fort was defended bravely.

Aftermath 
Fazıl Ahmet Pasha went on to capture Nógrád in Northern Hungary. Uyvar and the neighbouring area was declared a seat of beylerbey, as the Uyvar Eyalet of the Ottoman Empire. Subsequent clashes in the winter of 1663-1664 and in 1664 resulted in the Peace of Vasvár.

Citations

References

 
 
 
 
 

Ersekujvar
Conflicts in 1663
1663 in Europe
1663 in the Ottoman Empire
Érsekújvár (1663)
Ersekujvar (1663)
1663 in Slovakia
History of the Nitra Region